Valkyrian or Valkyrians may refer to:

 SS Valkyrian, a Swedish ship
 Hollow (band), a Swedish heavy metal band originally known as Valkyrian
 The Valkyrians, a Finnish ska and rocksteady band
 Valkyrian, a Swedish-American magazine
 Valkyrian, D. H. Conley High School's yearbook
 Valkyrian, the racehorse Kindergarten's damsire
 Valkyrians, characters in the video game series Valkyria Chronicles
 Valkyrian Airways, in the book series Cairo Jim

See also 
 Valkyria (disambiguation)
 Valkyrien (disambiguation)
 Valkyrie (disambiguation)